The 2010 West Coast Conference men's basketball tournament took place March 5–8, 2010, at Orleans Arena in Paradise, Nevada.

Format
The teams were seeded based on their record following a 14-game conference season.  The winner of the tournament received an automatic bid to the NCAA tournament.

Bracket

Asterisk denotes game ended in overtime.

External links
2010 WCC Tournament

West Coast Conference men's basketball tournament
Tournament
West Coast Athletic Conference men's basketball tournament
West Coast Athletic Conference men's basketball tournament
Basketball competitions in the Las Vegas Valley
College basketball tournaments in Nevada
College sports tournaments in Nevada